Kendriya Vidyalaya IIT Kanpur is a school situated in the IIT Kanpur campus, Kanpur in the Indian state of Uttar Pradesh. It was established in 1965 and is part of the Kendriya Vidyalaya system of schools. It has classes from grades I to XII.

History 
In 1965, Kendriya Vidyalaya IIT Kanpur was granted two bungalows. The initial enrollment was 60 for VI to IX. Since then, it has grown.

Academics
The school offers class VI to XII, each with five sections. A secondary wing offers classes from I to V. Kedriya Vidyalaya follows the curriculum set by the Central Board of Secondary Education (CBSE).

Achievements
During the initial years a number of meritorious students enrolled. Some KVS students are accepted by prestigious institutions including Indian Institutes of Technology and All India Institutes of Medical Sciences. 

Palash Katiyar received KVPY scholarships funded by Department of Science and Technology. Abhishek Srivastav took 6th in the Junior Math Olympiad in the year 2011. Students won medals at national levels in sport including tennis, badminton, cricket and athletics.

See also 
 Kendriya Vidyalaya
 IIT Kanpur

References

Kendriya Vidyalayas in Uttar Pradesh
IIT Kanpur
Primary schools in Uttar Pradesh
High schools and secondary schools in Uttar Pradesh
Schools in Kanpur
Educational institutions established in 1965
1965 establishments in Uttar Pradesh